Tanburi Büyük Osman Bey or Tamburi Büyük Osman Bey (1816–1885) was an Ottoman composer and Turkish tambur player. He is considered one of the most outstanding peşrev compositors in Ottoman classical music.

Life

Tanburi Büyük Osman Bey was born in 1816 in the Tophane district of Istanbul. Most of the information we have on him originates from an oral tradition amongst his pupils and the pupils of those who knew him. His father, Zeki Mehmed Ağa as well as his grandfather Tanburi Numan Ağa were musicians of renown. At the age of eight, he was accepted to the Imperial School of Enderun, where he began his education among the foregoing masters of Turkish classical music, from whom he acquired a firm theoretical basis. His acquaintance with the tanbur also dates back to those years.

As his father Zeki Mehmed Ağa is said to have refused to pass on to his son his knowledge of the tambur, most of the work must have come to be incumbent on Osman Bey himself. He is also said to have participated in fasıls with prominent vocal musicians of his time such as Rifat Bey and Haşim Bey, improving mostly his vocal technique. With the death of his father, he gave up singing and concentrated solely on his instrument and took part in "incesaz fasılları" performed at the court of Sultan Abdulaziz Han. He is said to have made most of his compositions at this period. As he was enthusiastic about Mevlana Djelaleddin Rumi, he frequented many mevlevihanes, especially the Kulekapısı Mevlevihanesi on Fridays.

He is also said to have had an obsessive temperament, known for attempting to beat a kanuni who played a false note while playing the transition to the final part of his uşşak peşrevi.

In 1885, he succumbed to a pulmonary disorder from which he had been suffering for a long time, and was buried in the cemetery of the Yahya Efendi Dergâhı in Istanbul. He had three sons and a daughter.

Compositions

As a composer, he excelled mostly in peşrevs which make up an important part of the Ottoman classical repertoire. His style displays a certain minimalism, avoiding rapid changes from one uslub to the other, thus lightening the peşrev form and conferring it with a balanced structure. Most of his peşrevs use devr-i kebir as a rhythmic basis and are easily distinguishable from the earlier works of his precedents. The only former peşrev composer he is said to have cherished is Gazi Giray Han, whose "Hüzzam Peşrevi" he designated the as "sehl-i mümtenî", ("a simple work done with great skill", “piece of a jewel"). After having refused for a long time to compose a peşrev in the same maqam (hüzzam) for the musical rites of the Mevlevi order, he finally composed his own famous hüzzam peşrevi on the instigation of the sheikh of the Galata Mevlevi Monastery Atâullah Efendi. This piece is still widely heard during Mevlevi rites.

Following is a list of extant compositions:

References

 Sources consulted 

 Endnotes

1816 births
1885 deaths
Turkish classical composers
19th-century people from the Ottoman Empire
Turkish tambur players
Musicians from the Ottoman Empire
Composers from the Ottoman Empire
Composers of Ottoman classical music
Composers of Turkish makam music
19th-century composers
Male classical composers
19th-century male musicians
19th-century musicians